Olney-Noble airport is a public-use airport located between Olney and Noble, Illinois, United States. It is publicly owned by the Olney-Noble Airport Authority.

The airport has two asphalt runways. Runway 11/29 is 4099 x 75 ft (1249 x 23 m), while runway 4/22 is 3598 x 60 ft (1097 x 18 m).

For the 12-month period ending March 31, 2020, the airport averaged 115 aircraft operations per week, or roughly 6,000 per year. This was 88% general aviation and 12% air taxi. For the same time period, there were 18 aircraft based on the field: 16 single-engine, 1 helicopter, and 1 glider.

The FBO on the airport, TDB Aviation, offers services such as parking, aircraft rental, aircraft maintenance, flight instruction, courtesy cars, and fueling.

References 

 Airports in Illinois